The Château Lescombes is a château in Eysines, Gironde, Nouvelle-Aquitaine, France. It dates to the 17th century. The dovecote was listed as a monument historique in 1992.

Notes

Houses completed in the 17th century
Châteaux in Gironde
Monuments historiques of Gironde